Patched 2 is a protein that in humans is encoded by the PTCH2 gene.

Function

This gene encodes a transmembrane receptor of the patched gene family. The encoded protein may function as a tumor suppressor in the hedgehog signaling pathway.

Clinical significance 

Alterations in this gene have been associated with nevoid basal cell carcinoma syndrome, basal cell carcinoma, medulloblastoma, and susceptibility to congenital macrostomia.

References

Further reading